Netta-Folwark  is a village in the administrative district of Gmina Augustów, within Augustów County, Podlaskie Voivodeship, in north-eastern Poland.

References

Netta-Folwark